Bogatynia (German: Reichenau in Sachsen) is a town in Zgorzelec County, Lower Silesian Voivodeship, in south-western Poland. As of December 2021, the town has a population of 16,460.

Geography
The municipal area forms Poland's "Turoszów panhandle" between the Czech town of Frýdlant in the east and the German town of Zittau in the west. To the southwest, the tripoint of the Czech, German, and Polish borders is located on the Neisse River.

History

The settlement of Richnow (modern German: Reichenau, i.e. 'rich vale') in the historical region of Upper Lusatia was first mentioned in a 1262 deed, then a possession of Cistercian St. Marienthal Abbey near Ostritz. It prospered from its location on an important trade route connecting Dresden, residence of the Meissen margraves, with Świdnica in Silesia. Initially a possession of the Kingdom of Bohemia, it passed to the Duchy of Jawor of fragmented Poland in 1319, again to Bohemia in 1346, to the Kingdom of Hungary in 1469, again to Bohemia in 1490, and to the Saxon Electorate by the 1635 Peace of Prague. From 1697 to 1763 it was also ruled by Kings of Poland in personal union.

The settlement suffered during the Hussite Wars (1425–1430) and Thirty Years' War (1618–1648). During the Great Northern War it was plundered by Swedish troops. Many inhabitants died in the War of the Polish Succession, fighting on the side of Augustus III of Poland. During the Seven Years' War, the occupying Austrian and Prussian armies imposed contributions on the inhabitants, confiscated food and even pillaged the village. In 1813, during the Napoleonic Wars and Polish national liberation fights, joint Polish-French forces commanded by Prince Józef Poniatowski were stationed in the village and later also Russian troops marched through the village. As Saxony had sided with the French Empire during the Napoleonic Wars, it had to cede the northeastern part of Upper Lusatia to Prussia according to the Final Act of the 1815 Vienna Congress. After the new border had been drawn, the village was the only possession east of the Neisse River that remained within Saxony. From 1871 to 1945 it was part of Germany. In the interbellum the settlement suffered economically from inflation and the Great Depression. Spared from damage during World War II, with the implementation of the Oder-Neisse line according to the post-war Potsdam Agreement, it passed to Poland and was granted a city charter. It is therefore the only municipality in Poland which until 1945 had not been part of Prussia (but of the Free State of Saxony). From 1945 to 1947 the town was renamed Rychwald followed by the current name.

The town used to be connected via narrow gauge railway lines opened in 1884 to Zittau and to the Bohemian border, where it was linked with the Frýdlant–Heřmanice Railway in 1900. Cross border service discontinued in 1945, and the railway line was closed in 1961.

On August 8, 2010, the Miedzianka stream flooded the entire central part of the town, causing heavy damage and destroying several historic buildings. The cause of the flooding was extremely heavy rain and the resulting swelling of the river Miedzianka. Two people died.

Economy

Today Bogatynia is one of the richest towns per capita in Poland, due to its two principal enterprises: the Turów Coal Mine, a large open-pit on the grounds of the former Rybarzowice village, and the associated thermal power station, Elektrownia Turów, operated by the Polska Grupa Energetyczna, the third-largest of the country. The word bogaty in Polish describes a rich or wealthy person - a calque from the town's original German name, Reichenau (reich: "rich").

International relations

See twin towns of Gmina Bogatynia.

Notable residents

 Johann Hübner (1668–1731), German geographer and scholar
 Johann Gottfried Schicht, composer (1753–1823)
 Ernst Friedrich Apelt, philosopher (1812–1859)
 Werner Dittrich (born 1937), German weightlifter
 Gerhard Richter (born 1932), German artist

References

External links

  
 Old postcards of Reichenau/Bogatynia at www.werkowski.eu

Cities and towns in Lower Silesian Voivodeship
Zgorzelec County